Alpenus microstictus is a moth of the family Erebidae. It was described by George Hampson in 1920. It is found in Nigeria.

References

Endemic fauna of Nigeria
Moths described in 1920
Spilosomina
Moths of Africa